The Ultimate Prom Nite is a Malaysian reality TV series produced by Primeworks Studios in cooperation with skincare maker Nivea. The inter-campus prom night seeks those worthy for the throne of "Ultimate Prom King and Queen" amongst students of various higher educational institutions throughout Malaysia.

Season two of The Ultimate Prom Nite aired on 8TV from 6 November till 11 December 2008. Hansen Lee and Sarah Lian were hosts, assisted by Marion Caunter and Henry Golding as judges.

Episode list

Auditions
Preliminary auditions were held from 8 July hingga 4 August in 12 selected campuses throughout Peninsular Malaysia, each of which provide a male and a female to vie for the coveted crowns.

Disted Stamford College, Penang
INTI International University College, Penang
INTI International University College, Nilai, Negeri Sembilan
INTI International University College, Subang Jaya
Kolej Damansara Utama, Penang
Kolej Lagenda, Nilai, Negeri Sembilan
Metropolitan College, Subang Jaya
Nilai International College
Olympia College, Kuala Lumpur
SEGi University College, Kota Damansara
Sunway University College, Johor Bahru
Taylor's University College

In addition, a thirteenth audition session was held in Sri Pentas, Bandar Utama (the headquarters of Media Prima and operational premises of its four TV channels), for students of just any higher-learning institution.

Those who qualified from each college might not necessarily be studying in the college where they took part. Those who qualified were:

Victor Lucas - Kolej Han Chiang
Kan Wai Ling - Sunway University College, Johor Bahru
Colin Chia Siang - Sunway University College, Johor Bahru
Felicia Tan - Taylor's University College
Mohd Farhan - SEGi University College, Kota Damansara
Atiqah Nabilah - Kolej Lagenda, Nilai
Adam Jayarathim - INTI International University College, Penang
Azimah Arshad - SEGi University College, Kota Damansara
Birendra Bahadur - INTI International University College, Nilai
Belinda Chong - INTI International University College, Nilai
Arvind Kalia - Kolej Damansara Utama, Penang
Mea Hing Jian - Nilai International College

Carmen Leong - Nilai International College
Hadry Hyzan - Taylor's University College
Fatin Johanna - Taylor's University College
Teng Ivan - Metropolitan College, Subang Jaya
Radiah Nazir - Taylor's University College
Mohd Izhafran - Kolej Lagenda Nilai
Shereen Liang - INTI International University College, Subang Jaya
Nicolette Ng - Metropolitan College, Subang Jaya
Syed Mohd Danial - Taylor's University College
Rhea M. Pereira - ?
Preeyan - APT Academy

Grooming
The qualified participants kicked off their journey toward the thrones by attending a week-long grooming session which began by a skincare class by Nivea and wholly uses Nivea products.

This was followed by an acting workshop led by Nazril Idrus and Sazzy Falak. The participants were made to make animal sounds for grouping; four distinct sounds were heard and thus they were divided into four groups. Each group took the stage to make a creative introduction before they practice what they were taught by playing a drama.

The acting session ended with some "nice walk" training, in which each contestant is required to make a creative and expressive grand entrance toward the audience in the same manner as TV hosts.

The weekend ended with Henry Golding and Marion Caunter stepping in as judges to test each contestant by asking questions and reviewing recorded confessions, to determine the Top 12. The lucky twelve who made it were: Farhan, Birendra, Adam, Ivan, Danial, and Jian (males); and Nicolette, Radi, Azimah, Fatin, Carmen, and Shereen (females).

Top 12
The Top 12 were taken to the 1 Utama shopping centre for their next challenge: the Mall Hunt, to test their abilities as team players, leaders and participants. They were divided into two teams of six – Team 1 and Team 2 (or Team A and Team B in the captions) – to perform a total of six tasks in the mall within a 90-minute limit; one task for one member of each team only. Before they begin each next task, each team was given a clue to determine their next task. After completing each task, the member who performed it collected a tag to mark their completion. The Mall Hunt was probably held no later than mid-September; this can be told from the Mid-Autumn Festival stalls in the footage.

The six tasks (and their riddles), in no particular order, were as follows:

The following are the Top 12 and their respective tasks, in chronological order:

Team 1 completed all their tasks and reached the finish line first, while Team 2 trailed behind by five minutes. At the decisive meeting with Caunter and Golding, all members of Team 1 were exempt from elimination as a reward for their success in the Mall Hunt, while those of Team 2 were called up for another round of questioning to ask them why each of them should remain in the game; as well as to determine which one girl and one boy should leave the competition. Radi and Biren wereeliminated from the challenge, leaving the Top 10 for their next challenge.

Top 10
Hari Raya Aidilfitri celebrations were around the corner, so the Top 10 were taken to the Rumah Kasih Harmoni orphanage in Sungai Buloh for a weekend to test their ability to display dedication, compassion, and their being a role model to society. Among the tasks which they performed there included cooking, housekeeping, laundry, fun and games with the orphans, as well as preparing for Raya.

On day two, the contenders were brought to Cineleisure Damansara where they were split into two again, i.e. the girls' and boys' stall, to sell as many Nivea "charity goodie bags" for five hours to raise as much money for Rumah Kasih Harmoni. Together they contributed RM3,000 to the orphanage fund (another RM7,000 was added by Nivea into the donation).

At the end of the charity stint, the Top 10 again faced Caunter and Golding for another round of inquisition of their experiences throughout the challenge, to determine who would be eliminated this time; it was Jian and Shireen's turn to depart from the competition.

Top 8
In October, four guys and four girls were assigned their final task before six of them would star in the Ultimate Prom Nite, which is a date with the hosts for dinner in Avanti's in Sunway Resort Hotel (Farhan, Carmen, Danial, Nicolette) or fun under the sun in Sunway Lagoon (Adam, Azima, Ivan, Fatin); the boys dated Sarah while Hansen went one-on-one with the girls. Earlier, after the Top 10 elimination, the remaining finalists picked a paper cutting from a transparent bowl to determine the venue of their date. "The Confidence Beauty Regime", their quick grooming-up with Nivea products, was a must for the contestants before each date.

Dinner
Farhan & Sarah:Farhan presented Sarah a sunflower to leave a good first impression. He reminded her that he is not an adventurous eater who largely insists on chicken. Midway through dinner, he presented her with a rose. When asked on his history with girlfriends, he replied that "it depends on how much is many." Moreover, he admitted that he had to abstain from 'sad' films that make him shed tears. After their meal, they played snooker in the lounge. At the end of the date, Farhan gave Sarah a collage of herself from the FHM magazine cover.
Carmen & Hansen: Carmen arrived at the dining table with brownies in a shopping bag for Hansen. When asked of herself, she answered that she was the eldest of four siblings; when asked back, Hansen just told her he was the youngest sibling of all sisters. When asked of her favourite qualities of men, her reply was those who could "make me laugh all the time." After the meal, they strolled at the garden in the vicinity of the hotel, where Hansen learnt that Carmen wanted to make her dates as memorable as possible.
Danial & Sarah: Danial presented Sarah with a small bouquet of three orange roses and a lavender before the meal, which Sarah thought was a "sweet gesture." Midway through their meal, Danial told Sarah he liked chicken rice but not durians. He also appeared less than adventurous in the garden walk. In the confession, Sarah said Danial's first impression was plain while their walk in the garden was "just a walk," which in all made him "not meet the requirements."
Nicolette & Hansen: Hansen commented on Nicolette's air of confidence when she walked in for dinner. When he asked of her ideal date, she replied that the date need not be fancy, just comfortable. She gave him a "cheeky" miniature teddy bear dressed with horns and a cape. They ended their date with dessert in the lounge.

Theme Park

Adam & Sarah: Adam greeted Sarah with a rose, treated her with ice-cream and took her around the Animal Park. Adam told her his favourite animal was the dragon, and the edited footage appeared to recreate what Adam imagined of the animals in the mini-zoo. They also shown trying out the Pirate's Revenge and Buffalo Bill Coaster rides in the Amusement Park, among others, and taking a doctored picture with a tiger in the snow.
Azima & Hansen: Azima started their date by giving Hansen a floral garland. They were shown riding in the Amusement Park, playing in the arcade and enduring the Scream Park. Azima commented that she and Hansen liked extreme sports. When asked of her favourite man on a ride, she was stumped, after telling Hansen she was not a fussy girl.
Ivan & Sarah: The date started with Sarah looking down from a tower at Ivan kneeling toward her with a rose. Ivan told her he hated one-on-one dates, having lived in groups all the time. They were shown riding the G-Force catapult and the Tomahawk. Sarah commented that although Adam was problematic, she thought it was a great date in which they learnt more of each other.
Fatin & Hansen: They first chose an exciting ride in the form of the Tomahawk, before visiting the Animal Park and playing the simulation race and video games in the arcade. Hansen commented that Fatin's ooze of confidence could "intimidate a guy," thus having passed with flying colours. On the carousel, Fatin presented Hansen a pencil sketch of himself on a sheet of paper.

The Top 8 confronted their last cut-out in SEGi Kota Damansara, this time with the hosts joining Caunter and Golding on the panel of four in the most crucial elimination session to select the Top 6 finalists for the Prom Nite. The judges reminded them that they were looking for one male and one female who could reach out to everyone rather than somebody intelligent or charming. Each contestant was evaluated individually concerning their date and their take on the competition and what they learnt while in contention.

Finally, the hosts short-listed Fatin, Adam, Azima, Ivan, Nicolette and Farhan as the Top 6 who would vie for the Ultimate Prom King and Queen crowns, leaving Danial and Carmen out of contention. From 27 November 2008, 10.30pm (after this episode was broadcast) till 10pm the next day, viewers would vote for their favourite contestant which forms 50% of the overall results, the other half being judges' evaluation, to determine the Prom King and Queen.

Finale
The "prom nite" of the Ultimate Prom Nite season two was recorded in the night of 28 November 2008, only to be telecast on 11 December. The top six arrived by limousine at the Kota Damansara campus of SEGi University College, which was also attended by 2007 Prom King Reagan Kang Ti Kern.

The event proper kicked off with a performance from the CHARM cheerleader squad, followed by the appearances in pairs of Adam and Nicolette, Ivan and Azima, and Farhan and Fatin, introduced by Lee and Lian in front of a dining hall audience. Also present were the judges Marion Caunter, Henry Golding and specially-invited Amber Chia on the panel. After the introductions, the hip-hop dance trio Floor Fever performed before the audience to the turntabling of DJ Iman.

The finalists' first challenge in the Prom Nite was to dance a ballroom-jazz routing in pairs, which they practised in William & Luisa's Danceworld as shown in the footage. Adam and Nicolette danced to Let It Rock by Kevin Rudolf and Lil Wayne; Ivan and Azima to Keeps Gettin' Better (Christina Aguilera); and Farhan and Fatin to Womanizer (Britney Spears).

The second and most important challenge for the top six was another question and answer session which seeks everything the judges needed to know to determine the most worthy for the crowns. Each contestant prepared a campaign video before they respond to judges' questions on their personality.

Adam’s campaign video had him preparing a meal in a kitchen to display the importance of living skills. After fulfilling her request to do a "catwalk", he responded to Marion's question of which challenge really affected him the most, which is the Raya charity stint in the orphanage, which he claimed reminded him to take a hard look at what he had which the orphans were not so lucky to have.
Fatin recorded herself in a futsal activity in her campaign video to display her sense of teamwork. Marion asked what was her definition of a role model, which she mentioned of her emphasis on time management. On Amber's question on life after college, she told that she would be a "super-cool" architect as well as pursuing a double diploma on architecture and fashion design.
Ivan made a music video of his own rap song. Henry asked for his motto in life; he gave "Success is not a destination; success is a journey."
Nicolette performed her rendition of Colbie Caillat's Realize and danced in her video, to emphasise on enjoyment. Henry asked for her strengths and weaknesses; her strength was her sense of "passion" but being perfectionist made her soft spot. Amber gave the role model question again, and she advised on giving one's best in studies but enjoying life at the same time.
Farhan told the world his life was about cars by drifting. Henry asked what he learnt throughout the competition; the seasoned "team leader" said he learnt of teamwork, understanding, open minds and leadership. Amber asked of his future after college, he admitted his dream of living luxuriously in Germany.
Fatin recorded herself scuba diving in the pool as a hobby which defined herself. Marion asked of her life after studies, she spoke of herself opening up businesses, possibly scuba diving, around the world. Amber asked for her weakness, and Fatin admitted being shy.

Before the results, a footage of whom the other 14 contestants voted for among the top 6 was screened. After the judges made their decision combined with the public votes, Adam and Nicolette were crowned the Ultimate Prom King and Queen respectively, each receiving RM10,000 and a 15-minute appearance on the 8TV Quickie.

Nicolette appeared on the Quickie on 16 December; Adam on the 19th.

References

External links
The Ultimate Prom Nite on 8TV, including Catch-Up TV

2008 Malaysian television seasons